Yusuf Soysal (born 26 April 1982) is a Turkish former football goalkeeper. Has been capped one time for the Turkey U-16 against Qatar on August 27, 1998 and conceded 2 goals

Soysal transferred to Kayseri Erciyesspor from Eskişehirspor in August 2005.  He has played 2 league matches for Kayseri Erciyesspor in the Turkish Süper Lig during the 2005–06 season.,

References

1982 births
Footballers from Frankfurt
German people of Turkish descent
Living people
Turkish footballers
Turkey youth international footballers
Association football goalkeepers
Gençlerbirliği S.K. footballers
Kayseri Erciyesspor footballers
Süper Lig players
TFF First League players
TFF Second League players